Culebros is a locality and minor local entity located in the municipality of Villagatón, in León province, Castile and León, Spain. As of 2020, it has a population of 68.

Geography 
Culebros is located 52km west of León, Spain.

References

Populated places in the Province of León